Siva Vanajah (born  March 2, 1971 in Kulim, Malaysia) is a Malaysian engineer and one of the finalist of the Malaysian Angkasawan program, a program to send a Malaysian to the International Space Station. An ethnic Indian, she was the only woman among four finalists who outlasted 11,000 other Malaysians that applied for the astronaut selection process in 2003, ultimately losing her bid to Sheikh Muszaphar Shukor and Faiz Khaleed. All the four finalists were sent to Moscow for training by the Russian Space Agency.

References

1971 births
Living people
People from Kedah
Malaysian engineers
Malaysian people of Indian descent